Manuel Wallner (born 25 October 1988) is an Austrian football defender who plays for Austria Klagenfurt.

References

Austrian footballers
Association football defenders
FK Austria Wien players
SC Wiener Neustadt players
1988 births
Living people